Michael Jennings may refer to:
Michael Jennings (American football) (born 1979), American football player
Michael Jennings (boxer) (born 1977), English professional boxer
Michael Jennings (rugby league) (born 1988), Australian professional rugby league footballer
a fictional character played by Ben Affleck in the movie Paycheck